Kheyrabad or Kheir Abad may refer to:

Afghanistan
Kheyrabad, Baharak District, Badakhshan
Kheyrabad, Khwahan District, Badakhshan
Kheyrabad, Balkh
Kheyrabad, Faryab
Kheyrabad, Ghor
Kheyrabad, Helmand
Kheyrabad, Kabul
Kheyrabad, Kunduz
Kheyrabad, Nimruz

Iran

Alborz Province
Kheyrabad, Alborz, a village in Savojbolagh County

Bushehr Province
Kheyrabad, Bushehr, a village in Dashtestan County

Chaharmahal and Bakhtiari Province
Kheyrabad, Chaharmahal and Bakhtiari, a village in Kiar County

East Azerbaijan Province
Kheyrabad, Bostanabad, a village in Bostanabad County
Kheyrabad, Meyaneh, a village in Meyaneh County

Fars Province
Kheyrabad, Arsanjan, a village in Arsanjan County
Kheyrabad (30°00′ N 53°45′ E), Bavanat, a village in Bavanat County
Kheyrabad, Darab, a village in Darab County
Kheyrabad, Rostaq, a village in Darab County
Kheyrabad, Jangal, a village in Fasa County
Kheyrabad, Kushk-e Qazi, a village in Fasa County
Kheyrabad, Firuzabad, a village in Firuzabad County
Kheyrabad-e Koruni, a village in Kazerun County
Kheyrabad, Kharameh, a village in Kharameh County
Kheyrabad Rural District, in Kharameh County
Kheyrabad, Khonj, a village in Khonj County
Kheyrabad, Khorrambid, a village in Khorrambid County
Kheyrabad, Mashhad-e Morghab, a village in Khorrambid County
Kheyrabad, Marvdasht, a village in Marvdasht County
Kheyrabad-e Hajji Ahmad, a village in Neyriz County
Kheyrabad, Qir and Karzin, a village in Qir and Karzin County
Kheyrabad, Sarvestan, a village in Sarvestan County
Kheyrabad, Sepidan, a village in Sepidan County
Kheyrabad, Arzhan, a village in Shiraz County
Kheyrabad, Zarqan, a village in Shiraz County

Hamadan Province
Kheyrabad, Hamadan, a village in Hamadan County
Kheyrabad, Malayer, a village in Malayer County
Kheyrabad, Razan, a village in Razan County
Kheyrabad, Tuyserkan, a village in Tuyserkan County

Hormozgan Province
Kheyrabad, Jask, a village in Jask County
Kheyrabad, Lirdaf, a village in Jask County
Kheyrabad, Rudan, a village in Rudan County
Kheyrabad, Rudkhaneh, a village in Rudan County

Isfahan Province
Kheyrabad, Ardestan, a village in Ardestan County
Kheyrabad, Chadegan, a village in Chadegan County
Kheyrabad, Falavarjan, a village in Falavarjan County
Kheyrabad, Kuhpayeh, a village in Isfahan County
Kheyrabad, Kuhestan, a village in Nain County
Kheyrabad, Najafabad, a village in Najafabad County
Kheyrabad, Tiran and Karvan, a village in Tiran and Karvan County
Kheyrabad, alternate name of Jafarabad, Tiran and Karvan, a village in Tiran and Karvan County

Kerman Province
Kheyrabad, Anbarabad, a village in Anbarabad County
Kheyrabad-e Pateli, a village in Anbarabad County
Kheyrabad, Arzuiyeh, a village in Arzuiyeh County
Kheyrabad, alternate name of Heydarabad, Arzuiyeh, a village in Arzuiyeh County
Kheyrabad, Bardsir, a village in Bardsir County
Kheyrabad, Mashiz, a village in Bardsir County
Kheyrabad, Fahraj, a village in Fahraj County
Kheyrabad, Kerman, a village in Kerman County
Kheyrabad, Rayen, a village in Kerman County
Kheyrabad, Narmashir, a village in Narmashir County
Kheyrabad, Rudbar-e Jonubi, a village in Rudbar-e Jonubi County
Kheyrabad-e Olya, Kerman, a village in Shahr-e Babak County
Kheyrabad, Balvard, a village in Sirjan County
Kheyrabad, Mahmudabad-e Seyyed, a village in Sirjan County
Kheyrabad, Sharifabad, a village in Sirjan County
Kheyrabad, Zarand, a village in Zarand County

Kermanshah Province
Kheyrabad, Kermanshah, a village in Sahneh County

Khuzestan Province
Kheyrabad, Khuzestan, a village in Shush County
Kheyrabad-e Gohar, a village in Behbahan County
Kheyrabad-e Do, a village in Shush County
Kheyrabad-e Sani, a village in Shush County

Kohgiluyeh and Boyer-Ahmad Province
Kheyrabad Khalifeh, a village in Gachsaran County
Kheyrabad-e Naser, a village in Gachsaran County
Kheyrabad-e Seyf Laleh, a village in Gachsaran County
Kheyrabad-e Sofla, Kohgiluyeh and Boyer-Ahmad, a village in Gachsaran County

Kurdistan Province
Kheyrabad, Kamyaran, a village in Kamyaran County
Kheyrabad, Marivan, a village in Marivan County

Lorestan Province
Kheyrabad, Aligudarz, a village in Aligudarz County
Kheyrabad, Zaz va Mahru, a village in Aligudarz County
Kheyrabad-e Olya, Lorestan, a village in Dowreh County
Kheyrabad-e Sofla, Lorestan, a village in Dowreh County

Markazi Province
Kheyrabad, Arak, a village in Arak County
Kheyrabad, Khomeyn, a village in Khomeyn County
Kheyrabad, Komijan, a village in Komijan County
Kheyrabad, Shazand, a village in Shazand County

Mazandaran Province
Kheyrabad, Mazandaran, a village in Neka County

North Khorasan Province
Kheyrabad, Esfarayen, a village in Esfarayen County
Kheyrabad, Faruj, a village in Faruj County
Kheyrabad, Shirvan, a village in Shirvan County

Qazvin Province
Kheyrabad, Buin Zahra, a village in Buin Zahra County
Kheyrabad, Qazvin, a village in Qazvin County

Qom Province

Razavi Khorasan Province
Kheyrabad, Chenaran, a village in Chenaran County
Kheyrabad, Golbajar, a village in Chenaran County
Kheyrabad-e Olya, Razavi Khorasan, a village in Dargaz County
Kheyrabad-e Sofla, Razavi Khorasan, a village in Dargaz County
Kheyrabad, Jowayin, a village in Jowayin County
Kheyrabad, Khvaf, a village in Khvaf County
Kheyrabad, Mahvelat, a village in Mahvelat County
Kheyrabad, Mashhad, a village in Mashhad County
Kheyrabad, Razaviyeh, a village in Mashhad County
Kheyrabad, Fazl, a village in Nishapur County
Kheyrabad, Mazul, a village in Nishapur County
Kheyrabad, Miyan Jolgeh, a village in Nishapur County
Kheyrabad, Sarvelayat, a village in Nishapur County
Kheyrabad, Quchan, a village in Quchan County
Kheyrabad-e Sharqi, a village in Quchan County
Kheyrabad, Sabzevar, a village in Sabzevar County
Kheyrabad, Rud Ab, a village in Sabzevar County
Kheyrabad, Taybad, a village in Taybad County
Kheyrabad, Nasrabad, a village in Torbat-e Jam County
Kheyrabad, Salehabad, a village in Torbat-e Jam County

Semnan Province
Kheyrabad, Semnan, a village in Semnan County

Sistan and Baluchestan Province
Kheyrabad, Bampur, a village in Bampur County
Kheyrabad, Dalgan, a village in Dalgan County
Kheyrabad, Iranshahr, a village in Iranshahr County
Kheyrabad, Bazman, a village in Iranshahr County

South Khorasan Province
Kheyrabad, Boshruyeh, a village in Boshruyeh County
Kheyrabad, Darmian, a village in Darmian County
Kheyrabad, Khusf, a village in Khusf County
Kheyrabad, Nehbandan, a village in Nehbandan County
Kheyrabad, Sarbisheh, a village in Sarbisheh County

Tehran Province
Kheyrabad, Baharestan, a village in Bahrestan County
Kheyrabad, Rey, a village in Rey County

West Azerbaijan Province
Kheyrabad, West Azerbaijan, a village in Miandoab County

Yazd Province
Kheyrabad, Behabad, a village in Behabad County
Kheyrabad, Taft, a village in Taft County
Kheyrabad, Yazd, a village in Yazd County

Zanjan Province
Kheyrabad, Soltaniyeh, a village in Abhar County
Kheyrabad, Mahneshan, a village in Mahneshan County

See also
Khairabad (disambiguation)
Khayrobod (disambiguation)
Kheyrabad-e Olya (disambiguation)
Kheyrabad-e Sofla (disambiguation)